Martin A. Linsky is a professor at the Harvard University Kennedy School of Government and a co-founder with Ronald A. Heifetz of Cambridge Leadership Associates. He served as Chief Secretary/Counselor to Massachusetts Governor William Weld from 1992 to 1995 and has published extensively on leadership, management, politics, and education.

Career 
He graduated from Williams College and Harvard Law School, and served as an assistant state attorney general and was the state representative from Brookline, Massachusetts from 1969 to 1973.

Linsky was Francis Sargent's choice for Lieutenant Governor in 1970, however two weeks before the Republican convention, Linsky dropped out of the race after it was revealed that police officers had once stopped his car and informed him that the woman was traveling with was a prostitute.

In 1972, Linsky was the Republican nominee for the United States House of Representatives seat in Massachusetts's 4th congressional district, but lost to incumbent Robert Drinan.

Publications
 Heifetz, Ronald A., Alexander Grashow, and Marty Linsky. The Practice of Adaptive Leadership: Tools and Tactics for Changing Your Organization and the World. Harvard Business Review Press, 2009.
 Bronznick, Shifra, Didi Goldenhar, Marty Linsky and Beverly Joel. Leveling the Playing Field: Advancing Women in Jewish Organizational Life. Advancing Women Professionals and the Jewish Community and Cambridge Leadership Associates, 2008. 
 Heifetz, Ronald A., and Marty Linsky. Leadership on the Line: Staying Alive through the Dangers of Change. Harvard Business School Press, 2017.

References

1940 births
Living people
Harvard Kennedy School faculty
Harvard Law School alumni
Williams College alumni
Republican Party members of the Massachusetts House of Representatives
Politicians from Brookline, Massachusetts